This is a list of electoral district results for the 1984 New South Wales state election.

Results by Electoral district

Albury

Ashfield

Auburn

Balmain

Bankstown

Barwon

Bass Hill

Bathurst

Blacktown

Bligh

Blue Mountains

Broken Hill

Burrinjuck

Burwood

Byron

Cabramatta

Camden

Campbelltown

Canterbury

Castlereagh

Cessnock

Charlestown

Clarence

Coffs Harbour

Coogee

Corrimal

Cronulla

Davidson

Drummoyne

Dubbo

Earlwood

East Hills

Eastwood

Elizabeth

Fairfield

Georges River

Gladesville

Gloucester

Gordon

Gosford

Goulburn

Granville

Hawkesbury

Heathcote

Heffron

Hornsby

Hurstville

Illawarra

Ingleburn

Kiama

Kogarah

Ku-ring-gai

Lachlan

Lake Macquarie

Lakemba

Lane Cove

Lismore

Liverpool

Maitland

Manly

Maroubra

Marrickville

Merrylands

Miranda

Monaro

Mosman

Murray

Murrumbidgee

Newcastle

Northcott

Northern Tablelands

North Shore

Orange

Oxley

Parramatta

Peats

Penrith

Pittwater

Riverstone

Rockdale

Ryde

St Marys

Seven Hills

South Coast 

Hatton was elected unopposed at the previous election.

Swansea

Tamworth

The Hills

Tuggerah

Upper Hunter

Vaucluse

Wagga Wagga

Wakehurst

Wallsend

Waratah

Waverley

Wentworthville

Willoughby

Wollongong

Woronora

See also 
 Results of the 1984 New South Wales state election (Legislative Council)
 Candidates of the 1984 New South Wales state election
 Members of the New South Wales Legislative Assembly, 1984–1988

Notes

References

Bibliography

1984 Legislative Assembly